Daniel James Frost,  (born 29 November 1970) is a British Earth scientist, currently Professor of Experimental Geosciences at the University of Bayreuth. His research focuses on the nature of Earth's deep interior, including the chemistry of the mantle and how it led to the development of the atmosphere, and the physical and chemical processes through which planets form.

Life and career 

Frost was born in Wolverhampton in 1970. After studying chemistry and geology at the University of London, he received a Ph.D. from the University of Bristol, which focused on high-pressure and high-temperature properties of carbon dioxide. Afterwards, he took a two-year post-doctoral fellowship at the Geophysical Laboratory of the Carnegie Institution in Washington D.C. before moving to the University of Bayreuth in 1997. In 2007 he was appointed Academic Director, and became Professor and Deputy Director of the Bavarian Research Institute of Experimental Geochemistry and Geophysics in 2012.

Research 

Frost's work combines geochemistry and geophysics to investigate structures and processes deep in Earth's interior, notably its mantle. His research uses high-pressure and high-temperature experiments on mineral, rock, and magma properties, and also involves measuring the velocities of seismic waves to determine the chemical composition of Earth's deepest and most inaccessible layers.

In 2019, a team of Bayreuth scientists, including Daniel Frost and Catherine McCammon, used high-pressure experiments to understand how carbon dioxide, water, and other oxygen-containing compounds escaped from Earth's mantle to form its atmosphere, so making the planet habitable.

In popular science news, Frost has been referred to as a scientist who makes diamonds from peanut butter – a reference to his high-pressure rock-crushing experiments that mimic the conditions of Earth's lower mantle.

Awards 

Frost's scientific awards include the MSA award of the Mineralogical Society of America (2006), the James B. Macelwane Medal of the American Geophysical Union (2006), the Arnold Sommerfeld Prize awarded by the Bavarian Academy of Sciences (2011) and the Gottfried Wilhelm Leibniz Prize of the German Research Council (2016). He was elected a Fellow of the European Association of Geochemistry in 2018 and a Fellow of the Royal Society in 2020.

Selected publications

See also
 Mantle oxidation state

References

External links
 

1970 births
Living people
Alumni of Royal Holloway, University of London
Earth scientists
Fellows of the Royal Society